Barys Rahula (Boris Ragula, 1 January 1920 – 22 April 2005) was a Belarusian political activist. He served as a military commander with the pro-German Belarusian Home Defence (BKA) during the Second World War. After the war he studied medicine in the West and became a doctor in Canada.

Life
Barys Rahula was born near Navahrudak and spent his early years in West Belarus, then part of the Second Polish Republic. In 1938, he became student at the University of Vilnius but was mobilized into the Polish army after the Nazi-Soviet invasion of Poland. He soon became a German POW, but in 1940 escaped from German prison to West Belarus occupied by the Soviets. In Belarus, he got arrested by the NKVD but managed to escape from prison in the first days after Germany's attack on the USSR.

Under German occupation, Rahula commanded Schutzmannschaft Battalion 68, taking part in anti-partisan actions against Polish and Soviet partisans. He left Belarus with the German army ahead of the Soviet advance.

After the war, Barys Rahula studied Medicine at the Catholic University of Leuven. In 1954 he moved to Canada and became one of the country's better known oncologists as well as one of the leaders of the Belarusian Canadian community. After the Chernobyl Disaster, Rahula organized fund raising to support victims of the catastrophe. He died in 2005.

References

Bibliography

Selected books
 Беларускае студэнцтва на чужыне (Belarusian Students in the Strange Lands)
 Жыцьцё пад агнём (Living under Fire)
 Against the Current

External links
 Boris Ragula. Against the Current on Google Books.
 Сьв. пам. Барыс РАГУЛЯ

1920 births
2005 deaths
People from Karelichy District
Belarusian Independence Party politicians
Members of the Rada of the Belarusian Democratic Republic
Polish military personnel of World War II
Byelorussian Home Defence personnel
Vilnius University alumni
Catholic University of Leuven (1834–1968) alumni
Soviet emigrants to Canada
Soviet politicians
Soviet expatriates in Belgium